Hoge's mabuya (Psychosaura macrorhyncha) is a species of skink found in Brazil.

References

Psychosaura
Reptiles described in 1946
Reptiles of Brazil
Endemic fauna of Brazil